Leonard Tow (born 1928) is an American businessman and philanthropist. He was the chairman and CEO of Citizens Communications (now Frontier Communications) and chairman of Electric Lightwave. He also co-founded Century Communications, which was sold to Adelphia Communications Corporation for $5.2 billion in 1999 and became part of Cablevision.

Biography 
Tow was born in 1928. He received his B.A. from Brooklyn College and Ph.D. from Columbia University in economic geography. He began his career as an instructor at Columbia Business School before leaving for the private sector. Tow worked for Touche Ross & Company and then became an assistant to Irving B. Kahn and eventually becoming SVP of TelePrompTer Corporation. He left TelePrompTer to found his own telecommunications company, Century Communications, which grew to become the nation’s fifth-largest cable television company at the time of its sale in 1999. He was also elected as Chairman and CEO of Citizens Communications, serving in those positions from 1989 to 2004 and was a director of Adelphia Communications Corporation.

Having retired from the cable industry, Tow began to focus on philanthropic activities through the Tow Foundation, which was founded in 1988. The foundation focuses on improving medical care and research, helping disadvantaged youths and reforming the juvenile justice system, as well as funding cultural institutions and the performing arts programs at higher education institutions in the tri-state New York Metropolitan area.

Tow has supported higher education institutions such as Bard College, Barnard College, Brooklyn College, Columbia University, City University of New York, John Jay College of Criminal Justice, University at Buffalo, University of New Haven, and Wesleyan University, as well as medical institutions such as Memorial Sloan Kettering Cancer Center, Hospital for Special Surgery, and the New York Genome Center.

In 2012, Tow and his wife signed The Giving Pledge, a public commitment to give away 50% of their wealth or more during their lifetimes or upon their death. Tow was a longtime member of the Forbes 400.

Tow is a recipient of the Carnegie Medal of Philanthropy in 2019.

Personal life 
In 1952, Tow married Claire Schneider (1929-2014), whom he met in college, and was a co-founder of Century Communications. She died in 2014 from Lou Gehrig's disease. The couple have three children and are residents of New Canaan, Connecticut. His son, Andrew Tow, is the owner of The Withers, a winery based in Sonoma County, California. His daughter, Emily Tow Jackson, is the President of the Tow Foundation and has served as a trustee of Barnard College, from which she graduated in 1988.

References 

Living people
American telecommunications industry businesspeople
American cable television company founders
Brooklyn College alumni
Columbia Graduate School of Arts and Sciences alumni
Columbia Business School faculty
Frontier Communications
American philanthropists
1928 births